Grgarske Ravne is a settlement north of Grgar in the Municipality of Nova Gorica in western Slovenia. It is located on the Banjšice Plateau and it forms a local community together with the nearby village of Bate.

References

External links
Grgarske Ravne on Geopedia

Populated places in the City Municipality of Nova Gorica